My Father's Dragon is a 2022 2D-animated fantasy adventure comedy film directed by Nora Twomey with a screenplay by Meg LeFauve who co-wrote the story with John Morgan. It is based on the 1948 children's novel of the same name by Ruth Stiles Gannett. The film is also dedicated to Morgan who had since died. It stars the voices of Jacob Tremblay, Gaten Matarazzo, Golshifteh Farahani, Dianne Wiest, Rita Moreno, Chris O'Dowd, Judy Greer, Alan Cumming, Yara Shahidi, Jackie Earle Haley, Whoopi Goldberg, and Ian McShane.

Co-produced by Netflix Animation, Mockingbird Pictures and Cartoon Saloon, the film was originally set for a 2021 premiere on Netflix, but was pushed to a Netflix release on November 11, 2022, after a limited theatrical release in Ireland, the United States, and the United Kingdom on November 4. The film received positive reviews from critics.

Plot
An unseen older woman tells the story of her father, Elmer Elevator, when he was a kid. He and his mother Dela owned a candy shop in a small town, but were soon forced to close down and move away when the people of the town moved away. They move to a faraway city where they plan to open a new shop, but they eventually lose all the money they save up while getting by.

Elmer soon befriends a cat and eventually gets the idea to panhandle the money needed for the store, only for his mother to tell him that it is a lost cause. Angered, Elmer runs to the docks to be alone. The Cat comes to him and begins speaking to him, much to his shock. She tells him that on an island, Wild Island, beyond the city lies a dragon that can probably help him. Elmer takes the task and is transported to the island thanks to a bubbly whale named Soda. Once they make it to Wild Island, Soda explains that a gorilla named Saiwa is using the dragon to keep the island from sinking, but it remains ineffective.

Elmer frees the dragon, a goof ball named Boris, and they go on an adventure in search of a tortoise named Aratuah to find out how Boris can keep the island from sinking for the next century. Boris explains that his kind has been saving the island as long as anyone can remember, and after he succeeds, he will be an "After Dragon". During this conversation, it is discovered that Boris cannot fly due to breaking his wing when Elmer saved him, and he reveals that he is afraid of both water and fire. The two make an agreement that Boris will help Elmer raise enough cash to buy a new store and will let the dragon go free once finished. Along the way, they encounter some of the islands inhabitants, like Cornelius the crocodile, the tiger siblings Sasha and George and a mother rhino named Iris all while trying to evade Saiwa and his monkey army.

They soon make it to Aratuah's shell, but Elmer finds out that he died, and leave as the island continues to sink. While resting on a flower, they are found by Saiwa and his forces and Saiwa reveals that he knew about Aratuah's death, which angers his macaque 2nd-in-command Kwan, who proceeds to use a giant mushroom as a raft to leave the island, convinced that it is hopeless to save. While flying with Boris, Elmer has an epiphany; it is the roots below the island that pull it down. He manages to convince Boris to fly with all his might and while Boris manages to free the island from two of the roots, he chokes when he gets overwhelmed by his fear of fire and upon crashing down, Elmer falls off the island.

Elmer is saved by Saiwa, who reveals that he and the other animals are evacuating the island and berates Elmer for wanting to use Boris for his own merits. He then reveals that once he found out about Aratuah's death, he was frightened about making everyone more worried and was even more worried when Boris showed up to save the island but Saiwa was weary of his goofy personality, so he lied and said he knew how to control Boris. Wanting to fix things, Elmer goes back to the island where Boris tells him he has found a way to save it by jumping into the fire and eventually, he bursts out and magically lifts the island from the sea, finally becoming an After Dragon.

After telling the animals of the island how to always let future dragons know the right way to save it, Boris takes Elmer home, passing by a surprised Kwan residing over on tangerine trees. Elmer reunites with his mother and the film ends with him embracing his new life in the city with his daughter narrating the end of the story.

Voice cast

Additional Voices by Debi Derryberry, Skip Stellrecht, Hope Levy, Terence Mathews, Annabel Lew, Andrew Morgado, Jim Pirri, Jon Olson, Cat Ring, Fred Tatasciore, Michelle Ruff, Eric Tiede, Georgia Simon, Frank Todaro, Kelly Stables, and Nora Twomey.

Production
In June 2016, it was reported that Cartoon Saloon was developing an adaptation of My Father's Dragon, with Tomm Moore and Nora Twomey co-directing it. In November 2018, Netflix announced that it had come on board the project. Twomey was now the sole director.

In April 2022, the cast was revealed along with a first image from the film, and Mychael and Jeff Danna as the composers of the film score.

As in Cartoon Saloon's previous feature films starting with Song of the Sea, the studio continued their use of TVPaint Animation for the hand drawn brush and pencil strokes in the character animation, but for the first time it used Toon Boom Harmony for effects and digital ink-and-paint. Moho software was also used for rigged animation of props and background elements, and also to handle background crowd animation.

Release
My Father's Dragon had its world premiere at the 66th BFI London Film Festival on October 8, 2022. The North American premiere was at the Animation Is Film Festival on October 22, 2022.

In November 2018, Netflix previously announced that the film would be released in 2021. However, in January 2021, Netflix CEO Ted Sarandos revealed that the film's release could be moved to "2022 or later", to meet Netflix's criteria of releasing six animated features per year. The film was shown in select theatres for a limited time in Ireland, the United States, and the United Kingdom on November 4, 2022. It was released on Netflix on November 11, 2022.

Reception

Critical response
 and on Metacritic the film has a score of 74 out of 100, based on 21 critics, indicating "generally favorable reviews."

Accolades

References

External links

Official trailer

 

2022 animated films
2022 fantasy films
2020s American animated films
2020s children's animated films
Irish animated films
American fantasy films
Cartoon Saloon films
Irish fantasy films
Animated films about dragons
Animated films based on children's books
English-language Netflix original films
Films produced by Bonnie Curtis
Films scored by Jeff Danna
Films scored by Mychael Danna
Netflix Animation films
2020s English-language films
Irish children's films